Polverini is an Italian surname. Notable people with the surname include:

Dario Polverini (born 1987), Italian footballer
Renata Polverini (born 1962), Italian politician and trade unionist

Italian-language surnames